The 16th edition of the Men's Asian Amateur Boxing Championships was held from February 26 to March 4, 1992 in Bangkok, Thailand.

Medal summary

Medal table

References

External links
Official Results

Asian Amateur Boxing Championships
Asian Boxing
Boxing